Elijah Kiptarbei Lagat (born 19 June 1966) was the winner of the 104th running of the Boston Marathon held in 2000. He won in the closest finish in the race's history when he edged out Gezahegne Abera of Ethiopia and fellow Kenyan and previous year's champion, Moses Tanui. Abera and Lagat were both clocked at 2 hours 9 minutes and 47 seconds while Tanui finished three seconds back.  Lagat's win enabled the Kenyans to capture the individual men's Boston Marathon title for the 10th straight year. This is a record that still stands.

Early life
Lagat was born and raised in Saniak, Kenya in the Nandi District.

2000 Sydney Olympics Marathon Controversy
Lagat's win in the Boston Marathon initially gave him a spot on Kenya's marathon team in the 2000 Olympics. Lagat indicated his enthusiasm for running in the Olympics immediately after Boston. However, later in the year the director of the Kenyan Amateur Athletics Association, David Okeyo, replaced the three runners who had initially made the team (Lagat, Tanui and Japhet Kosgei) with three other Kenyans Ondoro Osoro, Erick Wainaina and Kenneth Cheruiyot. He claimed that the three who had initially made the team had not been training hard enough. This move may have been precipitated by poor Kenyan showings in the Olympic marathons in the past. It also may have been brought about by the three initial qualifiers' criticism of the Kenyan Amateur Athletics Association officials. Despite Kenya's many successes in marathoning, they were unable to secure an Olympic gold medal until Samuel Wanjiru's record setting run in the 2008 Beijing games.

Later in the summer of 2000 however, Onsaro was shot in a carjacking incident. Lagat found his way back onto the team as a replacement after being clearly miffed by what he called a strange dismissal from the team. When the Sydney Olympics finally came about, Lagat was on the team and started the race but did not finish. He blamed his failure to finish on excessive preparation for the Olympic marathon; he claimed he wanted to show the Kenyan athletics officials he really could win but overtrained as a result.

Motivation
Lagat began running simply to lose weight and not necessarily to compete at the highest level of the sport. As a young man, a physician told him that he "had a lot of fat around his heart" and needed to lose weight. The Kenyan obliged and his weight decreased from 158 pounds in 1992 to 125 by the time he won Boston. He started jogging in 1993 and began competing in 1994.  He was already 27 when he first began competing; his late start in the sport is unusual and a testament to his innate talent. Before running, Lagat worked as an educational administrator before switching to full-time athlete.

Other victories
Lagat won the Prague Marathon in 1998 and the Berlin Marathon in 1997. His best time was a 2:07:41 during his win in Berlin.

He tried to defend his Boston title in 2001 but finished 17th with a time of 2:17:59 that year. He has not competed at the same level since then.

Politics
Prior to the 2002 general elections, Lagat was persuaded by his friends to vie for the Emgwen Constituency parliamentary seats. After initial resistance, Lagat agreed and vied for the seat on KANU ticket. He lost, however, to Stephen Kipkiyeny Tarus who represented the victorious NARC coalition. After the elections, Lagat continued his athletics career.

At the 2007 parliamentary elections, Lagat successfully vied for Emgwen Constituency parliamentary seat on ODM ticket, beating Tarus, who now represented the PNU party.

Education
He has a degree in History from University of Eastern Africa, Baraton, and a degree for an MBA in Strategic Management at Africa Nazarene University.

Personal life
Lagat is a member of the Seventh-day Adventist Church.

Achievements

See also

List of winners of the Boston Marathon

References

External links

1966 births
Living people
Kenyan male long-distance runners
Kenyan male marathon runners
Kenyan sportsperson-politicians
Kenyan Seventh-day Adventists
Athletes (track and field) at the 2000 Summer Olympics
Olympic athletes of Kenya
Kenya African National Union politicians
Orange Democratic Movement politicians
Members of the National Assembly (Kenya)
Boston Marathon male winners
Berlin Marathon male winners
Africa Nazarene University alumni
People from Nandi County